Sapre is a surname. Notable people with the surname include:

Abhay Manohar Sapre (born 1954), judge of the Supreme Court of India
Arun B. Sapre, M.D. Notable Neurosurgeon Chief of Surgery, Johns Hopkins Medicine
 Ajay A Sapre Scientists Nanotechnology 
 Sunil Sapre ,Chief Financial Officer of Persistent Info systems 
Madhu Sapre (born 1971), Indian model
 Bhagirathi Sapre, mother of Rani Laxmibai of Jhansi Manikarnika Queen of Jhansi 
Ramchandra Sapre (1915–1999), Indian chess player
Tara Govind Sapre (1919–1981), Indian politician